Kuwait as Independent Olympic Athletes (IOA) competed under the IOA flag at the 2017 Asian Indoor and Martial Arts Games which was held in Ashgabat, Turkmenistan from September 17 to 27. Only 2 competitors represented the IOA team during the event.

The Independent Olympic Athletes team won 1 bronze medal in the Kurash.

Participants

Medallists

Kurash

Independent Olympic Athletes participated in kurash.

Men

References 

Nations at the 2017 Asian Indoor and Martial Arts Games
Independent athletes